An apron is a raised section of ornamental stonework below a window ledge, stone tablet, or monument.

Aprons were used by Roman engineers to build Roman bridges. The main function of apron was to surround the feet of the piers.

Notes

References
 

Masonry
Architectural elements